In organic chemistry, ethenolysis is a chemical process in which internal olefins are degraded using ethylene as the reagent.  The reaction is an example of cross metathesis.  The utility of the reaction is driven by the low cost of ethylene as a reagent and its selectivity. It produces compounds with terminal alkene functional groups (α-olefins), which are more amenable to other reactions such as polymerization and hydroformylation.

The general reaction equation is:

Ethenolysis is a form of methylenation, i.e., the installation of methylene groups.

Applications 
Using ethenolysis, higher molecular weight internal alkenes can be converted to more valuable terminal alkenes.  The Shell higher olefin process (SHOP process) uses ethenolysis on an industrial scale. The SHOP α-olefin mixtures are separated by distillation, the higher molecular weight fractions are isomerized by alkaline alumina catalysts in the liquid phase. The resulting internal olefins are reacted with ethylene to regenerate α-olefins.  The large excess of ethylene moves the reaction equilibrium to the terminal α-olefins. Catalysts are often prepared from Rhenium(VII) oxide supported on alumina.

In one application, neohexene, a precursor to perfumes, is prepared by ethenolysis of diisobutene:

α,ω-Dienes, i.e., diolefins of the formula , are prepared industrially by ethenolysis of cyclic alkenes.  For example, 1,5-hexadiene, a useful crosslinking agent and synthetic intermediate, is produced from 1,5-cyclooctadiene: 

The catalyst is derived from rhenium(VII) oxide supported on alumina.  1,9-Decadiene, a related species, is produced similarly from cyclooctene.

In an application directed at using renewable feedstocks, methyl oleate, derived from natural seed oils, can be converted to 1-decene and methyl 9-decenoate:

References

Carbon-carbon bond forming reactions
Organometallic chemistry
Homogeneous catalysis